The 2016 Asian Sailing Championship was held in Abu Dhabi, United Arab Emirates 5–12 March and served as a qualification event for the 2016 Summer Olympics in six events.

Summary

Medal table

Event medalists

References

Asian Sailing Championship
Asian Sailing Championship
Sailing competitions in the United Arab Emirates
2016 in Emirati sport